Pulakeshinagar Assembly constituency is one of the 224 constituencies in the Karnataka Legislative Assembly of Karnataka a south state of India. It is also part of Bangalore North Lok Sabha constituency.

Members of Legislative Assembly
 2008: B. Prasanna Kumar, Indian National Congress
 2013: R. Akhanda Srinivasamurthy, Janata Dal (Secular)
 2018: R. Akhanda Srinivasamurthy, Indian National Congress

Election results

2018

See also
 Bangalore Urban district
 List of constituencies of Karnataka Legislative Assembly

References

Assembly constituencies of Karnataka
Bangalore Urban district